Gustav Herzog (born 11 October 1958) is a German politician of the Social Democratic Party (SPD) who served as a member of the Bundestag from the state of Rhineland-Palatinate from 1998 until 2021.

Political career 
Herzog first became a member of the Bundestag in the 1998 German federal election, representing Kaiserslautern. He was a member of the Committee on Transport and Digital Infrastructure and the Committee on the Digital Agenda.

In late 2019, Herzog announced that he would not stand in the 2021 federal elections but instead resign from active politics by the end of the parliamentary term.

Other activities 
 Federal Network Agency for Electricity, Gas, Telecommunications, Posts and Railway (BNetzA), Member of the Rail Infrastructure Advisory Council (since 2018)
 IG BCE, Member

References

External links 

  
 Bundestag biography 

1958 births
Living people
Members of the Bundestag for Rhineland-Palatinate
Members of the Bundestag 2017–2021
Members of the Bundestag 2013–2017
Members of the Bundestag 2009–2013
Members of the Bundestag 2005–2009
Members of the Bundestag 2002–2005
Members of the Bundestag 1998–2002
Members of the Bundestag for the Social Democratic Party of Germany